Four ships of the British Royal Navy have been named HMS Icarus, after the Icarus of Greek mythology.

 , an 18-gun brig-sloop launched in 1814, on coast guard duty in 1839, and sold 1861.
 , a screw sloop in service from 1858 to 1875.
 , a  composite screw sloop in service from 1885 to 1904.
 , an  laid down by John Brown and Company, Limited, at Clydebank in Scotland on 9 March 1936, launched on 26 November 1936.

Royal Navy ship names